Shahid Khan (born 1 January 1981), better known by his stage name Naughty Boy, is a British DJ, record producer, songwriter and musician. In 2012, Khan signed a three–year publishing deal with Sony ATV, as well as a recording contract to release one album under Virgin EMI Records. Khan launched himself as a record producer under the moniker "Naughty Boy" and runs his own production company called Naughty Boy Recordings.

He has produced two records for rappers Chipmunk and Wiley, both featuring Emeli Sandé. Naughty Boy and Sandé later formed a writing and production partnership, leading to Sandé landing her own record deal with Virgin and EMI. Sandé went on to be named the Critics Choice for the 2012 BRIT Awards, and release her debut album Our Version of Events (2012), a record co-written and produced with Naughty Boy. Khan spent 2011 and 2012 working on records for Leona Lewis, JLS, Cheryl, Jennifer Hudson, Alesha Dixon and Tinie Tempah, among others.

In 2013, Naughty Boy released his debut album Hotel Cabana. The set features prominent collaborator Sandé, as well as Ed Sheeran, Gabrielle and others. It was preceded by the release of the top-ten single "Wonder" (featuring Sandé), the number one hit "La La La", featuring Sam Smith and "Lifted", another collaboration with Sandé. His debut album peaked at number two in the UK.

On 19 October 2013, Naughty Boy's "La La La" was awarded 'Best Song' and 'Best Video' at the MOBO Awards' 18th Anniversary.

Early life 
Shahid Khan was born on 1 January 1981 in Watford, Hertfordshire. His parents being originally from Pakistan, and explaining the importance of his Pakistani identity, having also been in a school near Rawalpindi for two years, he says that he grew up listening to Pakistani music and watching Pakistani movies more than being influenced by Western culture, admiring the likes of Sultan Rahi and Mustafa Qureshi, ultimately professing that "I am a very proud Pakistani and I celebrate that". Educated at Westfield Academy, Watford, initially, Khan was studying Business and Marketing at London Guildhall University (now London Metropolitan University), but during his first semester, he decided to drop out and did various part-time jobs in Domino's Pizza and Watford General Hospital. He won £44,000 on Deal or No Deal and spent the money on a studio in his parents' garden, as well as giving his parents £15,000 and buying an Audi sports car. He "decided to follow his ambition to write and produce his own music, under the name Naughty Boy Recordings." In the background, Khan was recording songs in his parents' garden shed in Charlock Way in Watford, Hertfordshire. The finances allowed Khan to upscale production from the garden shed to a studio in Ealing, West London. Eventually, he got a three-year contract with Sony ATV, and a one-album record deal with Virgin Records (EMI Records).

Khan applied to The Princes Trust in 2005, where he was awarded a grant of £5,000 to help start up his business. Speaking to the Watford Observer in 2009 about the opportunity, Khan said "The Prince's Trust has a scheme where they want to help people who they feel can set up their own business. I wanted to make music but I didn't have any equipment. They said they wanted to help me." That same year, Khan appeared on Channel 4's hit day-time gameshow Deal or No Deal, where he won £44,000, further enabling him to purchase equipment and begin recording. The producer now bases his recordings at his studio in Ealing, West London.

Music career

2009–2012: Beginnings and producing 

The producer burst on to the music scene in 2009, by co-writing and producing Chipmunk's hit single "Diamond Rings", featuring Emeli Sandé. Khan would once again work with Sandé, this time on Wiley's "Never Be Your Woman" (2010), a cover of White Town's "Your Woman" (1997). Sandé later earned a record deal with Virgin Records, with Khan co-writing and producing her debut album, Our Version of Events. Naughty Boy was formally introduced and credited as an artist on Sandé's second single "Daddy", though he doesn't actually perform on the track.

Khan has also worked with Alesha Dixon, JLS, Lily Allen, Alexandra Burke and Jennifer Hudson. He also produced records for Professor Green, Cheryl Cole and Tinie Tempah. Khan worked with Sandé to produce and co-write Leona Lewis' 2012 comeback single "Trouble" which features Childish Gambino. Khan also wrote and produced "When It Hurts" and "Mountains" for Lewis' album Glassheart; However, "Mountains" was re-recorded by Sandé and put on her own album Our Version of Events. He also worked on records for Rihanna including "Half of Me" (co-produced with Stargate), "Side Effects of You" for Fantasia Barrino and co-produced "Craziest Things" with will.i.am for Cheryl Cole.

2012–2014: Hotel Cabana 

Khan also spent time, throughout the development of his career, working on his own debut album titled Hotel Cabana, which was scheduled to be released under his moniker "Naughty Boy" by Virgin EMI Records in 2013. The album's first single "Wonder" features frequent collaborator Sandé on the lead vocals. It was released on 30 September 2012 and also was the leading single from the re-release of Sandé's debut album, Our Version of Events, after already appearing on the US version of the album. It peaked at number ten on the UK Singles Chart.

British singer Gabrielle also worked with Naughty Boy for Hotel Cabana on a song called "Hollywood", which was initially tipped to be the album's second single, with the album following in February 2013. Gabrielle also revealed that fellow British singer-songwriter Ed Sheeran and British rapper Tinie Tempah will also feature on Hotel Cabana. Both Tempah and Sheeran have worked with Naughty Boy on previous records. It is the album's title song, "Hotel Cabana" which features Tempah. A trailer for Hotel Cabana was premiered on Naughty Boy's Vevo account on 20 September 2012. It states Hotel Cabana is "directed by Naughty Boy, starring Emeli Sandé, Tinie Tempah, Professor Green, Gabrielle and George the Poet". Of the album, Khan's opinion of it was "It has a concept to it, so it's more like a film in some respects", claiming "I'm not just a producer – I'm a director too". However, it did not happen until May 2013, that the second single "La La La" featuring Sam Smith was released. It reached number one in the UK, three in Ireland and three in Scotland. The album was released on 26 August 2013. It peaked at number two in the UK.

After completing work on his own album, in 2013, Khan resumed production for other artists. He worked on pop records for American singer Britney Spears, as well as joining Spears' sessions with producer William Orbit. British singer Lily Allen also asked Khan to produce records for her upcoming album. Additionally, he teamed up with Sandé and Katy Perry in New York to work on a song for Perry's then upcoming album, Prism (2013).

2015–present: The X Factor and second album
In March 2015, it was confirmed that Naughty Boy had worked with then-One Direction member Zayn Malik for one of the tracks of his second album. Malik exited the band shortly after this announcement, which led to many One Direction fans blaming Naughty Boy for Malik's departure.

On 16 September 2015, Naughty Boy announced that he would release a song titled "Runnin' (Lose It All)" featuring Beyoncé and Arrow Benjamin. On the same date, he shared the artwork for the single, its lyrics, a 15-second sound snippet along with a video through his Instagram account and began a countdown until its online release. The following day, on 17 September 2015, "Runnin' (Lose It All)" premiered online. It was available for digital download on the iTunes Store on 18 September 2015. "Should've Been Me", featuring vocals from Kyla and Popcaan was released as the second single on 18 November 2016. The song has peaked at number 61 on the UK Singles Chart. "One Chance to Dance", featuring vocals from Joe Jonas was released as the third single on 20 October 2017.

On 13 September 2017, Naughty Boy released a reworked edition of the Jackson 5's song "Dancing Machine" featuring vocals from Laura Mvula under the name of "Naughty Town", from an upcoming Motown covers album. According to The Evening Standard, Naughty Boy has also collaborated with Justin Timberlake and Dua Lipa on the album. In December 2017, Naughty Boy along with Wyclef Jean appeared on the final of the fourteenth series of The X Factor, guest performing "Dimelo" with contestants Rak-Su, his fellow Watford natives. Rak-Su won and the performance was released as the winner's single.

In January 2018, Naughty Boy announced his second album had experienced some delays due to legal issues; he wanted to call the album Now That's What I Call Naughty, but was legally challenged over its similarity to the Now That's What I Call Music! compilation album series. Describing the album as a playlist, he said "with my new album I wanted to make a real sick playlist that anyone and everyone can listen to." At the time of writing, he had completed studio sessions with Dua Lipa, Mike Posner, MNEK, Ray BLK, Joe Jonas, WizKid, Bebe Rexha, Paloma Faith, Tom Walker, Miguel, Calum Scott, Shenseea, Popcaan, Kyla, Ray BLK, Wyclef Jean, Craig David and Julia Michaels but refused to confirm which were for his own album.

On 18 April 2018, he released his collaboration with artist Ray BLK and Wyclef Jean titled "All or Nothing". On 7 December 2018, "Bungee Jumping" was released featuring vocals from Emeli Sandé and Rahat Fateh Ali Khan.
On 22 March 2019, "Undo" was released featuring Calum Scott and Jamaican dancehall artist Shenseea. At the time of writing (April 2019) Naughty Boy's second studio album was set for release in Autumn 2019. From 9–15 December, Naughty Boy appeared was part of the 'industry' panel for The X Factor spin off series, The X Factor: The Band, launched to try and find the UK's next biggest band. In July 2020, Naughty Boy was still working on the album. He said "But for my new album, I want (a song) to be entirely in Urdu and Hindi... It's the last song I need to complete (for the album) and I'm so excited for it." There were plans to release two singles in the Summer, with Naughty Boy confirming that "the two tracks will feature UK rappers Jaykae, Mist and American singer Harloe". He was also set to collaborate with tv personality Gemma Collins but this did not happen in the end as he chose to focus on his album. According to English DJ Jordan North, Naughty Boy was originally supposed to appear as contestant on series 20 of the British reality tv show I'm a Celebrity...Get Me Out of Here! (2020) but dropped out at the last minute; North ended up replacing Naughty Boy as a contestant.
 
Naughty Boy has also been working with British actress Jemima Khan and Indian Director Shekhar Kapur on their project What's Love Got to do with It?, due in 2022.

In 2021, Naughty Boy was announced as a contestant on the twenty-first series of  I'm a Celebrity...Get Me Out of Here!. Despite threatening to leave multiple times, and having regular arguments with campmates, he survived 16 days before he was eliminated on 8 December 2021.

Personal life
In 2017, Naughty Boy's mother was diagnosed with dementia, and he has openly spoken about using music as therapy to help his mother cope with the condition. He since joined the Dementia UK charity as an ambassador in 2020. Explaining his decision to join, he said "I'm so proud to announce that I'm an ambassador of Dementia UK and I hope that I can use my profile to raise awareness of the cause and the charity. With my mum's ever-changing condition and the pressures this places on the wider family, I understand how beneficial an Admiral Nurse would be."

Naughty Boy has also campaigned with local residents of Watford to change the Atria Shopping Centre back to its original name of "The Harlequin".

Discography

Albums

Singles

As lead artist

As featured artist

Writing and production discography

Awards and nominations

In January 2015, Khan was nominated for the Young Achiever award at the British Muslim Awards.

At The Asian Awards in 2016, Khan was honoured with the Outstanding Achievement in Music Award.

Brit Awards

iHeartRadio Music Awards

MOBO Awards

YouTube Music Awards

Brit Asia TV Music Awards

Notes
"Never Be Your Woman" was released as a standalone single in 2010; an alternative version dubbed "Never Be Your Woman (Bonus Track)" features on the album, Hotel Cabana.

References

External links
Hotel-cabana.com

1981 births
Living people
English people of Pakistani descent
English record producers
English songwriters
UK garage musicians
English DJs
English Muslims
People from Watford
British musicians of Pakistani descent
Male songwriters
21st-century English musicians
British rappers of Pakistani descent
21st-century British male musicians
British male songwriters
I'm a Celebrity...Get Me Out of Here! (British TV series) participants